Yick Wo v. Hopkins, 118 U.S. 356 (1886), was the first case where the United States Supreme Court  ruled that a law that is race-neutral on its face, but is administered in a prejudicial manner, is an infringement of the Equal Protection Clause in the Fourteenth Amendment to the U.S. Constitution.

Background
The immigration of Chinese to California began in 1850 at the beginning of the Gold Rush.  They soon began to branch out to jobs in agriculture and made up a large group of railroad workers.  As the Chinese became more successful, tensions with white Americans grew.  White Californians were wary of the cultural and ethnic differences.  The Chinese Exclusion Act of 1882 was the first of many pieces of legislation put into place to keep people from China from entering the United States. The government of California endeavored to prevent Chinese immigrants from working by requiring certain permits that they could not obtain, and passed legislation to prevent naturalization.   Many turned to the laundry business, and in San Francisco about 89% of the laundry workers were of Chinese descent. It was often the only job they could find.

In 1880, the elected officials of the city of San Francisco passed an ordinance making it illegal to operate a laundry in a wooden building without a permit from the Board of Supervisors.  The ordinance conferred upon the Board of Supervisors the discretion to grant or withhold the permits. At the time, about 95% of the city's 320 laundries were operated in wooden buildings. Approximately two-thirds of those laundries were owned by Chinese people.  Although most of the city's wooden building laundry owners applied for a permit, only one permit was granted of the two hundred applications from any Chinese owner, while only one out of approximately eighty non-Chinese applicants were denied a permit.

Yick Wo, was a laundry facility owned by Lee Yick. Lee Yick immigrated to California in 1861.  After 22 years of managing the facility, provisions set out by the San Francisco Board of Supervisors said that he could not continue to run it in a wooden building.  He continued to operate his laundry and was convicted and fined ten dollars for violating the ordinance.  He sued for a writ of habeas corpus after he was imprisoned in default for having refused to pay the fine.

San Francisco ordinance
Order No. 156, passed May 26, 1880

Issue before the Court
The state argued that the ordinance was strictly one out of concern for safety, as laundries of the day often needed very hot stoves to boil water for laundry, and indeed laundry fires were not unknown and often resulted in the destruction of adjoining buildings as well.  The petitioner pointed out that prior to the new ordinance, the inspection and approval of laundries in wooden buildings had been left up to fire wardens.  Yick Wo's laundry had never failed an inspection for fire safety.  Moreover, the application of the prior law focused only on laundries in crowded areas of the city, while the new law was being enforced on isolated wooden buildings as well.  The law also ignored other wooden buildings where fires were common—even cooking stoves posed the same risk as those used for laundries.

Opinion of the Court
The Court, in a unanimous opinion written by Justice Matthews, found that the administration of the statute in question was discriminatory and that there was therefore no need to even consider whether the ordinance itself was lawful. Even though the Chinese laundry owners were usually not American citizens, the court ruled they were still entitled to equal protection under the Fourteenth Amendment. Justice Matthews also noted that the court had previously ruled that it was acceptable to hold administrators of the law liable when they abused their authority. He denounced the law as an attempt to exclude Chinese from the laundry trade in San Francisco, and the court struck down the law, ordering dismissal of all charges against other laundry owners who had been jailed.

The Court held that while the law wasn't discriminatory, it had been applied with "an evil eye and an unequal hand" in singling out Chinese laundry business owner Lee Yick.

Legacy
Yick Wo had little application shortly after the decision. In fact, it was not long after that the Court developed the "separate but equal" doctrine in Plessy v. Ferguson, in practice allowing discriminatory treatment of African Americans. Yick Wo was never applied at the time to Jim Crow laws. However, by the 1950s, the Warren Court used the principle established in Yick Wo to strike down several attempts by states and municipalities in the Deep South to limit the political rights of blacks. Yick Wo has been cited in well over 150 Supreme Court cases since it was decided.

Yick Wo is cited in Hirabayashi v. United States to recognize that: "Distinctions between citizens solely based because of their ancestry are by their very nature odious to a free people whose institutions are founded upon the doctrine of equality. For that reason, legislative classification or discrimination based on race alone has often been held to be a denial of equal protection." However, the US Supreme Court upheld the conviction of Gordon Hirabayashi, the Japanese American who tested the curfew law and refused to register for the forced internment of people of Japanese descent during World War II.

In San Francisco there is a public school named Yick Wo Alternative Elementary School in honor of Yick Wo.

See also

Chinese American
Chinese Hand Laundry Alliance
List of United States Supreme Court cases, volume 118

References

External links
 
 
 Background 
 
 Bernstein, David E. (2007), Revisiting Yick Wo v. Hopkins
 Case Brief for Yick Wo v. Hopkins at Lawnix.com
 A documentary on Yick Wo v. Hopkins
 "Supreme Court Landmark Case Yik Wo v. Hopkins" from C-SPAN's Landmark Cases: Historic Supreme Court Decisions

Chinese-American history
Race and law in the United States
Minority rights case law
United States equal protection case law
United States Supreme Court cases
1886 in United States case law
Criminal cases in the Waite Court
History of San Francisco
Law in the San Francisco Bay Area
Chinatown, San Francisco
United States Supreme Court cases of the Waite Court
United States Fourteenth Amendment case law